No. 173 Squadron RAF was a Royal Air Force Squadron that was a communications unit in World War II.

History

Formation in World War II
The squadron formed on 9 July 1942 at Heliopolis, Egypt and equipped with the Hawker Audax and it went on to operate many other types of aircraft. It was renamed the 'Middle East Communications Squadron' on 29 February 1944.

Postwar
The squadron reformed as a ferry unit on 1 February 1953 and was finally disbanded on 2 September 1957.

Aircraft operated

References

External links
 History of No.'s 171–175 Squadrons at RAF Web
 173 Squadron history on the official RAF website

173
Military units and formations established in 1942
Squadron 173